The German amateur football championship was a national football competition in Germany organized by the German Football Association (German: Deutscher Fußball-Bund; DFB) and in existence from 1950 to 1998.

History

Overview
The championship was established in 1950 as a counterpart to the German football championship, which was open only to the winners of the tier-one Oberligas.

To qualify for the German amateur championship, a club had to play in the highest amateur league of its regional football federation. The majority of these leagues were tier-three leagues. Only in Niedersachsen, Bremen, Hamburg, Schleswig-Holstein and Berlin were these leagues set at the second level. From 1963, with the introduction of the Bundesliga, all these leagues became tier-three leagues, too.

To qualify for the amateur championship, a club either had to win its highest local amateur league and then not to have to take part in any post-season promotion-round. A club could also decline to take part in the promotion round and play in the amateur championship instead. Also, league winners who were reserve teams of professional clubs were ineligible for promotion to the professional level and had to play in the amateur championship instead. Mostly, however, the clubs playing in the championship were the runners-up of their leagues.

1950 to 1955
In the first five editions of the competition, the modus remained unchanged from season to season. Fifteen clubs competed in a knock-out system, whereby one club had a bye for the first round. Clubs paired against each other would only play one game to determine the winner of the tie. The competition only included teams from West Germany and West Berlin, East German clubs did not take part. Also, clubs from the Saarland did not take part either at this stage. The fifteen clubs came from the following leagues (tier):
 From the Southern region:
 Amateurliga Bayern (III)
 Amateurliga Württemberg (III)
 Amateurliga Südbaden (III)
 Amateurliga Nordbaden (III)
 Amateurliga Hessen (III)
 From the Southwest region:
 Amateurliga Rheinland (III)
 Amateurliga Südwest (III)
 Amateurliga Saarland (III) from 1955
 From the Western region:
 Landesliga Niederrhein (III) in three regional divisions
 Landesliga Mittelrhein (III) in two regional divisions
 Landesliga Westfalen (III) in five regional divisions
 From the Northern region:
 Amateurliga Bremen (II)
 Landesliga Schleswig-Holstein (II)
 Amateuroberliga Niedersachsen (II) in two regional divisions
 Amateurliga Hamburg (II)
 From West Berlin:
 Amateurliga Berlin (II)

From 1952, the knock-out system in the first round was replaced by a group stage, where in three groups of four and one group of three teams, a group winner was determined. This four winners then went on to the semi-finals.

1955 to 1964
The modus was altered in 1955, when, from then on, the five regions each determined their own champion. The five regional winners then qualified for the German amateur championship. The competition still operated on a knock-out system, but now only four games, ignoring possible replays, were played:
 A preliminary game between the West Berlin winner and one of the other four teams, altering on a yearly base.
 Two semi-final games
 The final

This system remained in place until the end of the 1963–64 season.

1964 to 1978
From the 1964–65 season, the sixteen regional champions, now with the Saarland, were again qualified for the competition. In a knock-out system, now with home-and-away games, the winner was determined. Only the final was played as an on-off match on neutral ground. Only in 1976–77 and 1977–78 was the final also played as a home-and-away contest. Otherwise, the modus remained unchanged until 1978, when the Amateur Oberligas were formed.

1979 to 1991
A league reform in 1978 reduced the number of tier-three leagues from sixteen to eight. Also, the leagues were renamed to Amateur Oberliga. The winner of each of those leagues qualified for the amateur championship, which was played as the years before, in a knock-out format with home-and-away games, including the final in the first season, 1978–79. From 1979 to 1980, the final was again played as a single game, but now as a home game for one of the two teams involved, to improve attendance figures.

The eight teams came from the following leagues:
 Amateur Oberliga Bayern
 Amateur Oberliga Baden-Württemberg
 Amateur Oberliga Hessen
 Amateur Oberliga Südwest
 Amateur Oberliga Berlin
 Amateur Oberliga Nordrhein
 Amateur Oberliga Westfalen
 Amateur Oberliga Nord

After the 1980–81 season, the winners of the eight leagues had to compete for 2. Bundesliga promotion. The amateur championship was therefore played out by the league runners-up from then on. This system in turn remained in place until the German reunion in 1991.

1991 to 1994
The effects of the German reunion changed the map of German football considerably and in regards of the German amateur championship, the number of teams qualified increased. East Germany and West-Berlin were sub-divided in three new Oberligas while the 'berliga Berlin was disbanded. The three new leagues were:
 NOFV-Oberliga Nord
 NOFV-Oberliga Mitte
 NOFV-Oberliga Süd

This meant, ten clubs, still the runners-up of their league, were now qualified for the competition. It was staged in two regional groups, north and south, with five teams each. Each team would play the other four in their group once and the two group winners would then stage the final. The 1991–92 competition marked a unique event, the Rot-Weiß Essen became the first and to-date only club to have taken out the German championship (1955) and the German amateur championship (1992) with its first team. Having won the German Cup in 1953, the club holds a unique triple of titles in German football.

This system only operated for three seasons, 1991–92, 1992–93 and 1993–94. It was replaced when the Regionalligas were established as the new tier-three leagues in Germany in 1994. From then on, the Oberligas were not the highest amateur leagues in the country any more.

1994 to 1998
Four Regionalligas were established in 1994 and the teams competing in the German amateur championship now came from these leagues:
 Regionalliga Nord
 Regionalliga Nordost
 Regionalliga West/Südwest
 Regionalliga Süd

In each of the three next seasons, four teams qualified for the competition in a varying set-up:
 1994–95: runners-up of the four leagues
 1995–96: champion Nordost, third placed West/Südwest, second and third placed Süd
 1996–97: champion Nordost, second and third placed West/Südwest, third placed Süd

The variation in teams qualified from each league resulted in a different number of teams from each league being promoted to the 2. Bundesliga.

In its last season, the championship was played with only three teams, the runners-up from West/Südwest and Süd and the winner of Nordost. Each played each other once only and the group winner Tennis Borussia Berlin was named German amateur champion. Additionally, the club was promoted to the 2. Bundesliga. This last edition, played without a final for the first time, was much more a promotion round with the amateur title being only a footnote.

Disbanding and current status
A lack of interest in the competition led to its being disbanded. It suffered from being regarded as a competition for failed clubs that had missed out on more meaningful regional or national honours, or that had missed promotion to a higher level of play. Attempts to make the competition more attractive by allowing the top teams of the competition into the German Cup tournament had little effect.

In May 2006, the chairman of the DFB (German Football Association), Theo Zwanziger, voiced his interest in re-establishing a national amateur championship from 2008 onwards, after the 3. Liga was to be formed. He left open as to whether the competition should be for the winners of  Regionalliga (IV) or Oberliga (V) play.

Media
The SC Jülich, the only club to win the title three times in a row, was the feature of a documentary by a German sports network, the Deutsches Sportfernsehen — DSF, about Germany's most successful amateur club. The club had fallen on hard times and almost folded in the 1990s, dropping to the lowest tier of the local league system before recovering.

List of winners
In its almost fifty-year history, the competition had thirty-eight different winners.

Finals 1950 to 1997

Source:

Group winners 1998

Winners and runners-up statistics

First edition 1950–51: clubs
Fifteen teams took part in the competitions first edition, taking place in June 1951, qualified from the following leagues:
 Amateurliga Bremen (runners-up): ATSV Bremen 1860
 Amateurliga Nordbaden (runners-up): Karlsruher FV
 Landesliga Niederrhein (winner group 1): SC Cronenberg
 Landesliga Mittelrhein (winner group 1): SSV Troisdorf 05
 Landesliga Schleswig-Holstein (runners-up): Heider SV
 Amateurliga Württemberg (runners-up): VfL Sindelfingen
 Amateuroberliga Niedersachsen (runners-up): SSV Delmenhorst
 Amateurliga Hessen (runners-up): Borussia Fulda
 Amateurliga Berlin (champion): VfL Nord Berlin
 Amateurliga Südbaden (champion): FC 08 Villingen
 Rheinland region: VfL Neuwied
 Amateurliga Hamburg (3rd placed): Union Altona
 Amateurliga Bayern (runners-up): FC Bayreuth
 Landesliga Westfalen (champion): SpVgg Röhlinghausen
 Südwest region: SC Zweibrücken

Notes

Note on the term amateur
The term "amateur" in German football nowadays does not quite mean the same as in other countries; it does not as such indicate that a player does not get paid but rather means the player is paid below a certain level, often a so-called Aufwandsentschädigung, which literally means "reimbursement of costs". Rather, in comparison with the league system in the United Kingdom, the term amateur could be translated with non-league.

Up until the formation of the Regionalligas, reserve teams of professional clubs carried the title Amateure behind the club name to distinguish first from second team. Because these teams are not truly amateurs, these teams now, like all other reserve sides, carry the II behind the name, for example, VfB Stuttgart Amateure became VfB Stuttgart II.

Attendance figures
The high number of spectators in the 1951, 1952, 1957 and 1961 finals results from the fact that the games were held as curtain raisers for the German championship finals.

References

Sources
 Deutschlands Fußball in Zahlen,  An annual publication with tables and results from the Bundesliga to Verbandsliga/Landesliga, publisher: DSFS
 Kicker Almanach,  The yearbook on German football from Bundesliga to Oberliga, since 1937, published by the Kicker Sports Magazine
 Die Deutsche Liga-Chronik 1945–2005  History of German football from 1945 to 2005 in tables, publisher: DSFS, published: 2006

External links
 Germany — Amateur Championship 1950–1995 Results of the competition from 1950 to 1995
 Das deutsche Fussball Archiv Historic league tables and results from Germany 

Defunct football competitions in Germany
Sports leagues established in 1950
Organizations disestablished in 1998
1950 establishments in West Germany